George Henry Child-Villiers, Viscount Villiers (29 August 1948 – 19 March 1998) was the first son of George Child-Villiers, 9th Earl of Jersey, and his third wife, Bianca Luciana Adriana Mottironi. He was a member of the Villiers family.

He was married three times: firstly, between 1969 and 1973, to Verna Scott; secondly, between 1974 and 1988, Sacha Jane Hooper Lauder, née Valpy; thirdly, from 1992 until his death, Stephanie Louisa Penman. The children of these marriages were:
 With Verna P. Stott:
 Lady Sophia Georgiana Child-Villiers (b. 25 June 1971)
 With Sacha Jane Hooper Valpy:
 William Villiers, 10th Earl of Jersey (b. 5 February 1976); He married Marianne De Guelle on 16 August 2003.
 Lady Helen Katherine Luisa Child-Villiers (b. 21 October 1978)
 Lady Luciana Dorothea Sacha Shaw (Nee Child -Villiers (b. 23 July 1981); She married Robert Shaw on the 13 September 2014.
 With Stephanie Louisa Penman:
 Hon. Jamie Charles Child-Villiers (b. 31 May 1994)

References 

1948 births
1998 deaths
British courtesy viscounts
George Henry Child Villiers, Viscount Villiers
Heirs apparent who never acceded